Cora is an unincorporated community in Logan County, West Virginia, United States. Cora has a post office with ZIP code 25614. It is part of the Mount Gay-Shamrock census-designated place.

Climate
The climate in this area is characterized by hot, humid summers and generally mild to cool winters.  According to the Köppen Climate Classification system, Cora has a humid subtropical climate, abbreviated "Cfa" on climate maps.

References

Unincorporated communities in Logan County, West Virginia
Unincorporated communities in West Virginia